SNKM (an abbreviation for Super Natural Kings & Masters, formerly Saturday Night Killing Machine and Sonic Nocturnal Kinetic Movement) is a duo of Pakistani musicians Adil Omar and Talal Qureshi, with both artists sharing production, songwriting and vocal duties.

SNKM launched in 2015 as Saturday Night Killing Machine and made their official US debut at SXSW the same year. In 2016, they joined the lineup for Diplo's Mad Decent Block Party. SNKM has also shared stages with artists such as Major Lazer, Skrillex, Elliphant, Rae Sremmurd, Kesha, Marshmello, Valentino Khan, Big Freedia and many others.

Discography

EPs
 2015: Saturday Night Killing Machine
 2020: Super Natural Kings & Masters

Singles
2015: Nighat & Paras
2017: Motors 
2017: Atomic Kitten 
2017: What Have We Done
2018: Revelations (Adil Omar featuring Elliphant, SNKM & Shaman Durek)

References

External links
 

Musicians from Islamabad
Pakistani musicians
Record production teams